The county governor of Oppland county in Norway represented the central government administration in the county. The county governor was based in Lillehammer. On 1 January 2019, the office was merged with the county governor of Hedmark into the county governor of Innlandet.

The large Akershus stiftamt was established in 1664 by the king and it had several subordinate counties (amt). In 1757, the large Aggershus amt was divided and the northern part became the new Oplandenes amt (later named "Oppland"). In 1781, the eastern part of the county was split off to form the new Hedemarkens amt (later renamed Hedmark) and the remaining part of the county became known as Christians amt (later renamed Oppland). In 2020, Hedmark and Oppland counties were merged into Innlandet county.

The county governor is the government's representative in the county. The governor carries out the resolutions and guidelines of the Storting and government. This is done first by the county governor performing administrative tasks on behalf of the ministries. Secondly, the county governor also monitors the activities of the municipalities and is the appeal body for many types of municipal decisions.

Names
The word for county (amt or fylke) has changed over time as has the name of the county.

List of county governors
Oppland county has had the following governors:

References

Oppland